Weinzierl is a surname of German origin. It is an occupational surname for a maker or seller of wine (vintner), or a habitational name from similarly named places in Austria and Bavaria. Notable people with the surname include:

Jan Weinzierl (born 1973), German tennis player
Kurt Weinzierl (1931–2008), Austrian television actor
Markus Weinzierl (born 1974), German football coach
Matthew C. Weinzierl, American economist
Nathalie Weinzierl (born 1994), German figure skater

References

German-language surnames
Occupational surnames